Emil Velić (born 6 February 1995) is a Slovenian professional footballer who plays as a goalkeeper for Greek Super League 2 club Xanthi. He also holds a Bosnian passport.

He started off his career at Slovenian club Domžale, before signing a contract with Belgian club Sint-Truiden in 2015. In January 2017, Velić joined Bosnian club Mladost Doboj Kakanj. He left Mladost in June 2020.

Career

Early career
Velić started playing football in the youth team of Slovenian club Domžale, who he left in July 2015 after joining and signing his first professional contract with Belgian First Division A club Sint-Truiden. He made one appearance for Sint-Truiden in the 2015–16 season.

Mladost Doboj Kakanj
Velić left Sint-Truiden in January 2017 and shortly after, on 22 January, signed a six-month contract with newly promoted Bosnian Premier League club Mladost Doboj Kakanj. He made his debut for Mladost on 25 February 2017, in the club's 3–1 home league win against Sloboda Tuzla. After showing himself as a good signing, the club decided to extended Velić's contract on 22 August 2017. On 20 July 2018, he once again extended his contract with the club until June 2020.

On 18 June 2020, Velić left Mladost after his contract with the club expired, three and a half years after joining them. In total, during that period, he played over 70 matches for Mladost and was one of the most important and best players in the team, being one of the key players that kept Mladost up in the Premier League. He was also regarded as one of the best Premier League goalkeepers during those seasons.

Career statistics

Club

References

External links
Emil Velić at Sofascore

1995 births
Living people
People from Sanski Most
Slovenian footballers
Slovenian expatriate footballers
Expatriate footballers in Belgium
Expatriate footballers in Bosnia and Herzegovina
Belgian Pro League players
Premier League of Bosnia and Herzegovina players
Sint-Truidense V.V. players
FK Mladost Doboj Kakanj players
Association football goalkeepers